Symposium are an English punk pop band. They were active from 1994 to 2000 and were known for their live shows. The name 'Symposium' originally referred to a drinking party (the Greek verb sympotein means "to drink together"), and was taken from the philosophical dialogue by Plato.

History
The band formed whilst still at school in Shepherd's Bush, London, in 1994. The line up was: Ross Cummins (vocalist), Hagop Tchaparian (guitarist/backing vocalist), Joe Birch (drummer), William McGonagle (guitarist), and Wojtek Godzisz (vocalist/songwriter).

The band had a selection of uptempo punk pop songs which, together with their young average age of eighteen, bought them to the attention of Korda Marshall who signed them to Infectious Records in 1996.

Debut single "Drink the Sunshine" in 1996 was followed by support from NME, who placed them on the "Bratbus Tour" (an annual tour of four hotly tipped bands) which would visit universities in the UK. In March 1997, the band's concerts had been noted by Everett True, who put them on the cover of the 29 March 1997 Melody Maker, proclaiming them to be the "best live band in Britain". The band released a No. 25 UK hit single, "Farewell to Twilight" in March 1997. They also performed the song on TFI Friday. This was followed by a headlining tour.

They released a mini album, One Day at a Time, in October 1997, stating in NME that they "just wanted to get them [the songs] out there". The release alluded to the fact that their actual (full-length) debut album would be released at a later date. This was illustrated by the fact that one of the four singles they had released up until this point, "The Answer To Why I Hate You", was absent from the mini-album, but did appear on their first album On The Outside. Having signed a recording contract with Infectious Records. "Farewell to Twilight" achieved a UK Singles Chart peak of No. 25, a position that they would never surpass.

"Fairweather Friend" was the band's best known song, having support from a music video, and this led to a Top of the Pops performance. In 1997 the band supported a number of popular American bands, including Red Hot Chili Peppers at Wembley Arena, The Foo Fighters, Deftones and No Doubt at Brixton Academy, where Cummins' stage antics caused him to dislocate his leg. The following year the band toured the United States on the Warped Tour with Bad Religion, NOFX and Rancid.

Their debut album On The Outside was released in May 1998. By the end of 1999 the band had left Infectious Records. After supporting Metallica at the Milton Keynes Bowl in 1999, Symposium released the "Killing Position" EP. By early 2000 the band had developed musical differences and broke up.

McGonagle and Birch formed the post-hardcore band Hell Is for Heroes, whilst Cummins eventually resurfaced in 2004 with Paper Cuts. The band's primary songwriter Wojtek Godzisz went solo and signed to Tigertrap Records in 2006.  His eponymous debut album was released in 2009.

Hagop Tchaparian went on to work with the band Hot Chip.  He is a consultant to the music industry. Tchaparian released his debut album Bolts in October 2022.

2022-onwards 
On 22 April, 2022, an update was made via the Symposium facebook page, the band announced that their albums (One Day At A Time, and On The Outside) are now available on all streaming websites. With the added bonus of a compilation album "Do You Remember How It Was?" due out for 11 November, 2022. Ross, Wojtek, Will and Joe will be participating in a Q&A at Signature Brew in Haggerston on 19 May, 2022, hosted by Kerrangs!'s Phil Alexander. There was also a promise of a live show announcement coming soon. It has since been announced that they will play for “one night only” at Islington Assembly Hall in November 2022.

Members
Ross Cummins – vocals
Wojtek Godzisz – vocals, bass
Hagop Tchaparian – guitar, occasional backing vocals
William McGonagle – guitar
Joe Birch – drums

Discography

Albums and EPs

Singles

References

External links
Paper Cuts
Wojtek Godzisz
The Letter G

Britpop groups
Musical groups established in 1995
Musical groups disestablished in 2000
Infectious Music artists
Musical groups reestablished in 2022